The Chrome Lacrosse Club is a professional men's field lacrosse team in Premier Lacrosse League (PLL). The Chrome are one of the six founding members of the PLL for the 2019 season. Notable players include Jordan Wolf, Will Haus, and Justin Guterding.

Roster

*Indicates unavailable to travel list

Source:

(C) indicates captain

Coaching staff
 Head coach – Tim Soudan
 Assistant coach – Nick Fiorentino
 Assistant coach – Jacques Monte

All-time draft selections
2019

2020 Entry Draft

The 2020 player entry draft occurred on March 16 for teams to select players arriving from rival Major League Lacrosse. On March 4, Paul Burmeister and NBCSN hosted an entry draft lottery for selection order. Out of 100 balls to select from, Waterdogs had 40, Chrome had 25, Atlas had 15, Archers had 10, Chaos had 6, Redwoods had 3, and the champion Whipsnakes had 1.

Rob Pannell was announced to be transferring to the PLL on March 9, followed by 15 other players the following day, which comprised the selection pool for the entry draft. A total of 14 players were selected in the entry draft with remaining new players entering the league player pool.

2020 College Draft

2021 Entry Draft

2021 College Draft

2022 College Draft

Season-by-season records

Season results

PLL award winners
Dave Huntley Sportsmanship Award
 Connor Farrell: 2019
Rookie of the Year

 Brendan Nichtern, 2022

Dave Pietramala Defensive Player of the Year

 JT Giles-Harris, 2022
Brendan Looney Leadership Award

 Jordan MacIntosh, 2022

Dick Edell Coach of the Year

 Tim Soudan, 2022

Head coaches

All-time record vs. PLL clubs

See also

References

Premier Lacrosse League teams
Lacrosse clubs established in 2019